Robert Lewis may refer to:

Film and television
Robert Lewis (director) (1909–1997), American actor, director and founder of the Actors Studio
Robert Q. Lewis (1920–1991), radio and TV personality
Robert Lloyd Lewis (active since 2006), American television and film producer
Robbie Lewis, fictional character in Morse
Rob Lewis (Neighbours), fictional character in NeighboursMusic
Bobby Lewis (1925–2020), American rock and roll and R&B singer
Robert Hall Lewis (1926–1996), American trumpeter, composer, conductor 
Bobby Lewis (country singer) (born 1942), American country music singer-songwriter
Bob Lewis (musician) (born 1947), founder and member of Devo
Rob Lewis (producer) (born 1976), American music arranger and musical director
Rob Lewis (record producer) (active since 1982), American record producer

Politics
Robert Lewis (MP) (died 1561), British politician, Member of Parliament for Canterbury
Robert Lewis (died 1649), MP for Reigate
Robert Jacob Lewis (1864–1933), American politician from Pennsylvania
Robert Kennedy Lewis, St Lucian politician
Robert S. Lewis (1856–1956), American politician from North Dakota
Robert W. Lewis (born 1951), American politician from Vermont
Bob Lewis (politician) (1925–2015), American politician from state of Washington

Sports
Bob Lewis (basketball, born 1925) (1925–2012), American basketball player, played for the Utah Utes
Bob Lewis (golfer) (born 1944), American golfer
Bobby Lewis (basketball, born 1945), retired American basketball player, played for the North Carolina Tar Heels
Robert B. Lewis (1924–2006), racehorse owner
Dale Lewis (ice hockey) (Robert Dale Lewis, born 1952), Canadian ice hockey player
Robert Lewis (rugby union) (born 1987), Welsh rugby union player

Other
Rob Lewis (entrepreneur) (born 1969), entrepreneur and executive chairman of Omnifone
Rob Lewis (marine scientist), director of SARDI
Robert A. Lewis (1917–1983), United States Air Force officer, co-pilot of the Enola Gay''
Robert E. Lewis (1857–1941), United States federal judge
Robert Lewis (lynching victim) (died 1892), American lynched in Port Jervis, NY
Robert F. R. Lewis (1826–1881), United States Navy officer
Robert Benjamin Lewis (1802–1858), African and Native American author and entrepreneur
Robert Patrick Lewis, former Green Beret and 1st Amendment Praetorian co-founder

See also
Bert Lewis (disambiguation)
Robert Louis (disambiguation)